Meiracyllium trinasutum  is a member of the family Orchidaceae. It is a miniature sized creeping epiphyte or lithophyte native to Mexico, Guatemala and El Salvador.

References

Orchids of Mexico
Orchids of Central America
Plants described in 1854
Laeliinae